Thomas Nowell Twopeny or Twopenny (6 February 1819 – 3 November 1869) was a priest of the Church of England who was Archdeacon of Flinders in  Australia. 
 
He was the eldest son of Thomas Nowell Twopenny of East Knoyle, Wiltshire. He was educated at Uppingham School and Oriel College, Oxford and was ordained in 1844. He was Rector of Little Casterton, Rutland, from 1844 (succeeding his grandfather Rev. Richard Twopeny, rector 1781–1843), then in 1859 of South Weston, Oxfordshire, before going out to Australia with the Melrose mission in ca 1860.

Twopeny married Mathilde Anaïse Louis (or Lewis) on 22 October 1851, at St Matthew's Church, Jersey. His sons, born in Little Casterton, Edward Nowell Twopeny and Richard Ernest Nowell Twopeny were prominent in Australia.

A stained glass window by William Wailes was erected in his memory in the chapel of St Peter's College, Adelaide in 1872.

References

19th-century English Anglican priests
Archdeacons of Flinders
People educated at Uppingham School
Alumni of Oriel College, Oxford
1819 births
1869 deaths
People from Wiltshire
People from Little Casterton